A. N. Prabhu Deva is the former vice chancellor of Bangalore University. He was the director of Sri Jayadeva Institute of Cardiovascular Sciences and Research before getting appointed as VC of Bangalore University.

References

Living people
Year of birth missing (living people)
Academic staff of Bangalore University
Place of birth missing (living people)